Calliostoma simodense is a species of sea snail, a marine gastropod mollusk in the family Calliostomatidae.

Some authors place this taxon in the subgenus Calliostoma (Tristichotrochus).

Description
 The height of the shell attains 10 mm.µ

Distribution
This marine species occurs in the Indo-Pacific and off Japan.

References

External links
 

simodense
Gastropods described in 1942